Brooke Kamin Rapaport is Deputy Director and Martin Friedman Chief Curator at Madison Square Park Conservancy  in New York City. She is responsible for the outdoor public sculpture program of commissioned work by contemporary artists. With an exhibition of Martin Puryear's work, Martin Puryear: Liberty/Libertà, Rapaport served as Commissioner and Curator of the United States Pavilion at the 2019 Venice Biennale. She frequently speaks on and moderates programs on contemporary art and issues in public art. Rapaport also writes for Sculpture magazine where she is a contributing editor. She lives in New York City.

Education
Rapaport was born in Red Bank, New Jersey. She received a Bachelor of Arts, cum laude, from Amherst College and a Master of Arts in Art History from Rutgers University. Rapaport was a Helena Rubinstein Fellow in Museum Studies at the Whitney Museum of American Art Independent Study Program in New York City.

Career
Rapaport was the assistant curator (1989 to 1993) and associate curator (1993 to 2002) of contemporary art at the Brooklyn Museum in New York City. She organized numerous exhibitions and wrote corresponding catalogues for Vital Forms: American Art and Design in the Atomic Age, 1940–1960 (with Kevin L. Stayton), and Twentieth Century American Sculpture at the White House: Inspired by Rodin (1998, with colleagues) She also realized exhibitions with contemporary artists in the
Grand Lobby series of installations including Houston Conwill,Leon Golub,Komar and Melamid, and Meg Webster.

As guest curator at The Jewish Museum in New York City, Rapaport organized The Sculpture of Louise Nevelson: Constructing a Legend, a 2007 survey exhibition that traveled to The Fine Arts Museums of San Francisco, de Young. A catalogue published by Yale University Press accompanied the Nevelson exhibition and was named best Editors' Picks in the Arts and Photography books of 2007 by Amazon.com. The volume also won the New York State Historical Association's Henry Allen Moe Prize for Catalogues of Distinction in the Arts in 2009.

Rapaport organized Houdini: Art and Magic at The Jewish Museum in 2010. The show traveled to venues in Los Angeles, San Francisco, and Madison, Wisconsin. Yale University Press published the exhibition catalogue.

She is a contributing editor and writer for Sculpture magazine and has published articles on artists including contemporary plant artists, Alice Aycock, Christo and Jeanne-Claude, Melvin Edwards, R.M. Fischer, DeWitt Godfrey, Louise Nevelson, John Newman, Judy Pfaff, Shinique Smith, and Ursula von Rydingsvard. She authored a blog on artists' materials and processes for the International Sculpture Center. Her essay, Why Calder is Back: A Modern Master's Creative Reuse of Materials was included in the exhibition catalogue Alexander Calder and Contemporary Art: Form, Balance, Joy at the Museum of Contemporary Art, Chicago.

At Madison Square Park Conservancy, Rapaport has organized outdoor projects with contemporary artists including Diana Al-Hadid, Tony Cragg, Abigail DeVille, Leonardo Drew, Teresita Fernández, Hugh Hayden, Paula Hayes, Cristina Iglesias, Maya Lin, Josiah McElheny, Giuseppe Penone, Martin Puryear, Arlene Shechet, and Krzysztof Wodiczko Through Madison Square Park Conservancy in 2017, she established Public Art Consortium, a national initiative of museum, public art program, and sculpture park curators.

In August 2018, Madison Square Park Conservancy, along with the U.S. Department of State's Bureau of Educational and Cultural Affairs, announced that Martin Puryear will represent the United States at La Biennale di Venezia 58th International Art Exhibition. The 2019 U.S. Pavilion was commissioned and curated by Rapaport. The exhibition marked the first time in the history of the Biennale that the U.S. Pavilion was organized by an institution whose visual arts program is focused exclusively on public art. An accompanying catalogue, with essays by Rapaport, Darby English, Anne M. Wagner, and Tobi Haslett, was published by Gregory R. Miller & Co.

She sits on the boards of the Adolph and Esther Gottlieb Foundation, the Al Held Foundation, the von Rydingsvard and Greengard Foundation, the Mead Art Museum at Amherst College, and formerly Socrates Sculpture Park. In 2022, she received an honorary Doctor of Arts from Amherst College.

References

External links
Sculpture magazine

American art curators
American women curators
Living people
Amherst College alumni
Rutgers University alumni
Year of birth missing (living people)
21st-century American women